March of the Zapotec/Holland is a double EP by Beirut. March of the Zapotec contains music influenced by Zach Condon's then recent trip to Oaxaca, Mexico. The Jimenez Band, a 19-piece band from Teotitlán del Valle, backs Condon on this EP. March of the Zapotec also features one of Condon's favorite works, "The Shrew". Holland contains electronic music, credited to "Realpeople", one of Condon's pre-Beirut pseudonyms.

Leak and Early Release 
On January 23, 2009, the EPs leaked to file-sharing networks, and four days later, on January 27, the iTunes US and UK stores made the album available for purchase.

Track listing

Music videos 
Owen Cook animated and directed the official video for "La Llorona", which is thematically related to the legend of La Llorona, a popular story from Mexico also famous in other places in Central America.

References 

2009 EPs
Beirut (band) albums